Patrick Sinyinza is a Zambian diplomat and is the current Ambassador of Zambia to Russia, presenting his credentials to Russian President Dmitry Medvedev on 5 February 2010.

References

Living people
Ambassadors of Zambia to Russia
Zambian diplomats
Year of birth missing (living people)